The 2010 United States Senate election in New Hampshire was held on November 2, 2010, alongside other midterm elections to the United States Senate in other states as well as to the United States House of Representatives. A primary election was held on September 14. Incumbent Republican U.S. Senator Judd Gregg decided to retire instead of seeking a fourth term. Republican nominee Kelly Ayotte won the open seat by over 23 points.

, this was the last time the Republicans won a U.S. Senate election in New Hampshire. This was also the first open seat election in the state since 1992. With Democrat Jeanne Shaheen serving in the state's other Senate seat, New Hampshire became the first state in the union to be represented in the Senate simultaneously by two women of opposite parties.

Background 
Gregg was reelected with 66% of the vote in 2004, and indicated that he would seek a fourth term in 2010. New Hampshire trended Democratic in the 2006 and 2008 elections, with Republican incumbents losing both of the state's House seats and its other Senate seat to Democrats, but polling conducted in late December 2008 showed Gregg defeating both of the state's U.S. Representatives in a hypothetical match-up.

In February 2009, President Barack Obama offered, and Gregg accepted, nomination to the position of United States Secretary of Commerce. New Hampshire's Democratic Governor John Lynch announced he would appoint Bonnie Newman, former Assistant Secretary of Commerce for economic development in the Reagan administration, to serve as Senator for New Hampshire until the election in 2010. Newman announced that she would not run for election in 2010, nor would she endorse any candidate in the race.

On February 12, 2009, however, Gregg withdrew his nomination for Commerce Secretary. He cited "irresolvable conflicts" over policy related to the Commerce Department as the main reasons for his withdrawal, but also indicated support for President Obama. Gregg continued to serve as a senator from New Hampshire, as he did not resign from the Senate during the nomination process. At the time of the withdrawal, Gregg indicated that he would not run for reelection in 2010. However, at a subsequent press conference, Gregg clarified that he would "probably not" run for reelection, leading to speculation that was not eliminating the possibility completely.

On April 1, 2009, Gregg reaffirmed that he would not run.

Meanwhile, Democratic U.S. Representative Paul Hodes began his Senate campaign. He was the only major announced candidate until Attorney General Kelly Ayotte announced her bid for the Republican nomination in early July 2009. On November 9, 2009, Republican Ovide Lamontagne joined the race as well.

Republican primary

Candidates 
 Kelly Ayotte, former New Hampshire Attorney General
 Tom Alciere, state representative
 Gerard Beloin
 Jim Bender, businessman
 Bill Binnie, businessman
 Dennis Lamare
 Ovide Lamontagne, 1992 congressional candidate and 1996 gubernatorial nominee; chairman of 2004 platform committee

Endorsements

Polling

Results

General election

Candidates 
 Kelly Ayotte (R), former state Attorney General
 Ken Blevens (L), (campaign site, PVS)
 Chris Booth (I), (campaign site, PVS)
 Paul Hodes (D), U.S. Representative since 2007

Campaign 
Hodes called himself a fiscal conservative, which was mocked by Ayotte in a TV ad. Hodes was criticized for supporting President Obama's Economic Recovery package, a carbon energy tax, and Affordable Care Act. Hodes criticized Ayotte for numerous controversies. One ad was questioned Ayotte's honesty in dealing with the Lakes Region Ponzi scheme which defrauded investors of almost $80 million.

Ayotte was endorsed by the Concord Monitor and the Nashua Telegraph.

Debates 
 October 11 in Henniker at New England College
 October 28 in Manchester

Predictions

Polling

Fundraising

Results

References

External links 
 New Hampshire State Board of Elections
 U.S. Congress candidates for New Hampshire at Project Vote Smart
 New Hampshire U.S. Senate 2010 from OurCampaigns.com
 Campaign contributions from Open Secrets
 2010 New Hampshire Senate General Election: All Head-to-Head Matchups graph of multiple polls from Pollster.com
 Election 2010: New Hampshire Senate from Rasmussen Reports
 2010 New Hampshire Senate Race - Ayotte vs. Hodes from Real Clear Politics
 2010 New Hampshire Senate Race from CQ Politics
 Race profile from The New York Times
Official campaign websites (Archived)
 Ovide Lamontange for U.S. Senate
 Kelly Ayotte for U.S. Senate
 Jim Bender for U.S. Senate
 Bill Binnie for U.S. Senate
 Paul Hodes for U.S. Senate

2010
New Hampshire
Senate